Eupithecia hebes is a moth in the family Geometridae. It is found in north-western China (Shanxi).

The wingspan is about 17 mm. The forewings are pale grey-brown. The hindwings are slightly paler than the forewings.

References

Moths described in 2004
hebes
Moths of Asia